This is a list of electoral results for the Electoral division of Fannie Bay in Northern Territory elections.

Members for Fannie Bay

Election results

Elections in the 1970s

 Preferences were not distributed.
 The number of votes each individual Independent received is unknown.

Elections in the 1980s

Elections in the 1990s

Elections in the 2000s

Elections in the 2010s

Elections in the 2020s

References

Northern Territory electoral results by district